Petra Hildér (born 5 February 1967) is a Swedish former freestyle swimmer. She competed in the women's 4 × 100 metre freestyle relay at the 1984 Summer Olympics.

References

External links
 

1967 births
Living people
Olympic swimmers of Sweden
Swimmers at the 1984 Summer Olympics
Swimmers from Stockholm
Swedish female freestyle swimmers
20th-century Swedish women